EOS-01 (formerly known as RISAT-2BR2 ) is an X-band, synthetic-aperture radar (SAR) based all weather Earth imaging satellite built by the Indian Space Research Organisation (ISRO) for tasks pertaining to forestry, agricultural and disaster management. It is a part of India's RISAT series of SAR imaging spacecraft and would be third satellite in the series including RISAT-2B, RISAT-2BR1 with 120° phasing.

Launch 
EOS-1 (RISAT-2BR2) has been launched on board a PSLV-DL PSLV-C49 launch vehicle on 7 November 2020 along with 9 foreign satellites. The satellite was although earlier scheduled for first half of 2020, impact of COVID-19 pandemic in India affected ISRO's activities and delayed a number of programs by months and it was first launch mission of ISRO in 2020. Due to fears of infections amid pandemic, gathering of staff and media were dismissed for this launch.

As per reports on 29 October 2020, RISAT-2BR2 was renamed as "EOS-01" per new naming criteria adopted by ISRO.

See also 
 RISAT
 List of Indian satellites

References

External links 
 PSLV-C49/EOS-01 
 PSLV-C49/EOS-01 Gallery 

Space programme of India
Indian Space Research Organisation
Satellites of India
Earth observation satellites of India
Space synthetic aperture radar